May Ruth Snyder (née Brown; March 27, 1895 – January 12, 1928) was an American murderer. Her execution in the electric chair at New York's Sing Sing Prison in 1928 for the murder of her husband, Albert Snyder, was recorded in a highly publicized photograph.

Murder of Albert Snyder
May Ruth Brown met Albert Edward Snyder (né Schneider) in 1915 in New York City, when she was 20-years-old and he was a 33-year-old artist. The couple had little in common; Brown, who went by her middle name Ruth to most people and was known as "Tommy" to close friends, was described as vivacious and gregarious, while Snyder was described as very reserved and a "homebody". Despite their differences in personalities and age, the couple married and settled in a modest house in Queens. In 1918, Ruth gave birth to their only child, a daughter named Lorraine. Albert Snyder worked as an art editor for Motor Boating magazine, published for most of its run by Hearst Magazines, and made one-hundred dollars a week.

In 1925, Ruth began an affair with Henry Judd Gray, a married corset salesman who lived in the New Jersey suburbs. She began to plan the murder of her husband Albert, enlisting Gray's help, but he was reluctant. Some claim that Ruth's distaste for her husband apparently began when he insisted on hanging a picture of his late fiancée, Jessie Guischard, on the wall of their first home and named his boat after her. Guischard, whom Albert described to Ruth as "the finest woman I have ever met", had been dead for 10 years.  However, others have noted that Albert Snyder was emotionally and physically abusive, blaming Ruth for the birth of a daughter rather than a son, demanding a perfectly maintained home, and physically assaulting both her and their daughter Lorraine when his demands were not met.

Ruth first persuaded Albert to purchase insurance, and with the assistance of an insurance agent (who was subsequently fired and sent to prison for forgery), "signed" a $48,000 life insurance policy that paid extra if an unexpected act of violence killed the victim. According to Gray, Ruth had made at least seven attempts to kill Albert, all of which he survived. On March 20, 1927, the couple garrotted Albert with a picture wire, stuffed his nose full of chloroform-soaked rags, and beat him with a sash weight, then staged his death as part of a burglary. Detectives at the scene noted that the burglar left little evidence of breaking into the house. Moreover, Ruth's behavior was inconsistent with her story of a terrorized wife witnessing her husband being killed.

Police discovered that the property Ruth had claimed had been stolen was still in the house, but hidden. A breakthrough came when a detective found a paper with the letters J.G. on it (it was a memento Albert had kept from former lover Guischard) and asked Ruth about it. A flustered Ruth's mind immediately turned to Gray, whose initials were also J.G., and she asked the detective what Gray had to do with the murder. It was the first time Gray had been mentioned, and the police instantly became suspicious. Gray was found in Syracuse, New York. He claimed he had been there all night, but it was found out a friend of his had set up Gray's room at a hotel to support his alibi. Gray proved far more forthcoming than Ruth about his actions. He was caught and returned to Queens and charged along with Ruth.

The trial

Ruth and Gray turned on each other, contending the other was responsible for killing Albert; both were convicted and sentenced to death.

Execution
Ruth was imprisoned at Sing Sing in Ossining, New York. On January 12, 1928, she became the first woman to be executed at Sing Sing since Martha Place in 1899. She went to the electric chair 10 minutes before Judd Gray, her former lover. Her execution (by New York State Electrician Robert G. Elliott) was surreptitiously photographed at the moment electricity was running through her body with the aid of a miniature plate camera strapped to the ankle of Tom Howard, a Chicago Tribune photographer working in cooperation with the Tribune-owned Daily News. Howard's camera later was owned by inventor Miller Reese Hutchison and later became part of the collections of the Smithsonian Institution's National Museum of American History.

Ruth was interred in the Woodlawn Cemetery in the Bronx. Her footstone reads "May R." and includes her date of death. Gray was interred in Rosedale Cemetery in Montclair, New Jersey.

Lorraine Snyder

Following the pronouncement of the death sentence on Ruth Snyder in May 1927, legal disputes arose between the relatives regarding the care of the Ruth and Albert's daughter, Lorraine, who was nine-years-old at the time. Warren Schneider, brother of Albert, petitioned to be allowed to appoint a legal guardian who was not a member of Ruth's family. Josephine Brown, mother of Ruth, also petitioned for custody of the girl. Lorraine had been in the care of Brown since the murder. Lorraine was formally placed by her maternal grandmother in the Catholic institution where she had been residing at the time of her mother's execution. Ruth requested that her daughter not be brought to the prison for a final visit.

On September 7, 1927, Josephine Brown was awarded guardianship of the girl. During this time, there were disputes with the insurance company Ruth had used to insure her husband's life. Although one policy, worth US$30,000, to Gray's daughter, was paid without contest, they filed suit to void two other policies, worth $45,000 and $5,000 (the three combined policies worth $ million in ). By May 1928, the insurance company made available $4,000 for the maintenance of Lorraine. In November 1928 a ruling in the case was reached, with a court finding the policies could not be collected because they had been issued fraudulently. At the time of the judgment, the lawyer acting on behalf of Ruth's family asked the court to allow them to appeal without a printed record on the basis that the family was destitute and unable to sell the house due to the notoriety of the case. By May 1930, it was ruled on appeal that the two policies were invalid.

While incarcerated on death row, Ruth Snyder wrote a sealed letter which she requested be given to Lorraine "when she is old enough to understand". One year after her mother's execution, Lorraine was apparently aware that her parents were both dead, but not of the manner of either of their deaths.

Depiction in popular media
 The drama Machinal (1928) by playwright Sophie Treadwell is based on Snyder's trial.
 The movies Blessed Event (1932) and Picture Snatcher (1933) make references to Snyder's execution.
 A fictionalized version of the trial was the basis of scenes in State's Attorney (1932) with John Barrymore as the prosecutor.
In the movie The Penguin Pool Murder (1932), the characters suspect their case is similar to the Snyder-Gray case. There is also a reference to a woman being recently executed.
 The case was the inspiration for the novella Double Indemnity (1936) by James M. Cain, which was adapted for the screen (1944) by Billy Wilder and Raymond Chandler.
 Cain mentioned that his book The Postman Always Rings Twice (1934) took inspiration from the crime.
 Raymond Chandler's 1949 novel The Little Sister alludes to the Ruth Snyder photograph in Chapter 16.
 Near the end of the 1951 film The Thing from Another World, a reporter named Scotty mentions that Snyder's execution was the first he ever covered. When another character asks Scotty if he was able to get a picture, Scotty answers "No, they didn't allow cameras, but one guy..." The approach of "The Thing" interrupts him, but Scotty seemingly is referring to Howard's photo of Snyder in the electric chair.
 In the 1954 novel The Bad Seed, author William March based his depiction of Bessie Denker's execution upon that of Ruth Snyder.
 Guns N' Roses' 1991 album Use Your Illusion features, as part of the enclosed artwork, a photo of the band posing in front of an oversized reproduction of the Daily News headline/photograph announcing Ruth Snyder's execution.
 Saul Bellow's 1953 novel The Adventures of Augie March alludes to the Ruth Snyder photograph in Chapter 8.
The 2001 book Seeds of Evil: The Gray-Snyder Murder Case by Karl Schweizer is an account of the case, and is based on actual court records interspersed with vivid dialogue.
The 2011 novel A Wild Surge of Guilty Passion by Ron Hansen is based on the murder case.

See also

 Edith Thompson and Frederick Bywaters
 Capital punishment in New York (state)
 Capital punishment in the United States
 List of people executed in New York

References

Bibliography
 Bryson, Bill. (2013). One Summer: America, 1927. New York: Doubleday. .
 MacKellar, Landis. (2006). The "Double Indemnity" Murder: Ruth Snyder, Judd Gray, & New York's Crime of the Century. Syracuse, NY: Syracuse University Press. .
 Ramey, Jessie: "The Bloody Blonde and the Marble Woman: Gender and Power in the Case of Ruth Snyder", in: Journal of Social History Vol. 37, No. 3 (Spring, 2004), pp. 625–650
Karl W .Schweizer, Seeds of Evil (Author House, 2001)Novelized account based on rare court records and documents.

External links
 Mug shot of Ruth Snyder (high-resolution) from Lloyd Sealy Library, John Jay College of Criminal Justice
 Snyder/Gray murder case details, from The People's Almanac by David Wallechinsky & Irving Wallace
 

1895 births
1928 deaths
1927 murders in the United States
20th-century executions by New York (state)
20th-century American criminals
20th-century American women
Place of birth missing
American people convicted of murder
American female murderers
Executed American women
20th-century executions of American people
People executed for murder
People executed by New York (state) by electric chair
People from Queens, New York
People convicted of murder by New York (state)
Murderers for life insurance money
Filmed executions
People notable for being the subject of a specific photograph
Executed people from New York (state)
Burials at Woodlawn Cemetery (Bronx, New York)
Mariticides
Housewives